Shree Jaykorbai Vidymandir is a co-education high school in Mehsana district, Gujarat, India.

Location
Shree Jaykorbai Vidyamandir was established in 1945 by Vishvanath Pancholi. Shree Jaykorbai Vidyamndir is a secondary and higher secondary schools in Mehsana District. It is located in Kherva near Sidhhnath Mahadev temple on road of Devrasan and Udalpur. Shree Jaykorbai Vidyamandir is 10 km from Mehsana town.

Education
This school has higher secondary education in two streams: Commerce and Arts. In 2016, Science is also started.

KG-1 to Std.-5 (English Medium) and Primary Education (Gujarati Medium) is also included. These batches are running at Shree Hasmukhbhai Joitaram Patel Vidya Sankul (English Medium School) under management of Shree Jaykorbai Vidyamandir, Kherva.

References

High schools and secondary schools in Gujarat
Mehsana district
1945 establishments in India
Educational institutions established in 1945